a feudal domain in Edo period Japan, located in Dewa Province (modern-day Yamagata Prefecture), Japan. It was centered on Kaminoyama Castle in what is now the city of Kaminoyama, Yamagata.

History
Kaminoyama Domain was situated on the strategic Ushū Kaidō, subroute of the Ōshū Kaidō connecting Edo with the northern portion of Honshu. The domain was sandwiched in between the powerful Yamagata Domain to the north and the Yonezawa Domain to the south.

During the Muromachi period, the area was noted as a hot spring resort and a stronghold of the Mogami clan. It was a contested territory between the Mogami and the Date clans during the Sengoku period, and later between the Mogami and the Uesugi clan. After the destruction of the Mogami clan by the Tokugawa shogunate, Kamiyama Domain (40,000 koku) was created in 1622 for Matsudaira Shigetada, who laid out the plan of the future castle town. The Matsudaira were replaced by the Gamō clan from 1626-1627, followed by the Toki clan from 1628-1691, and the Kanemori clan from 1692-1697.
Kaminoyama Domain was then ruled by the Fujii branch of the Matsudaira clan from 1698 until the Meiji restoration. The domain had 2200 households per the 1852 census and maintained its primary Edo residence (kamiyashiki) in Azabu. The clan’s Edo temple was Tessho-ji in Nishi-Asakusa.

During the Bakumatsu period, the domain strongly supported the Tokugawa shogunate, and samurai from the domain played a key role in the attack on the Satsuma Domain residence in Edo. During the Boshin War, the domain joined the Ōuetsu Reppan Dōmei and troops from the domain were involved in the Battle of Hokuetsu, as a substantial portion of the domain’s holdings were also in Echigo Province.

After the end of the conflict, with the abolition of the han system in July 1871, Kaminoyama Domain became “Kaminoyama Prefecture”, which later became part of Yamagata Prefecture.

Bakumatsu period holdings
Dewa Province (Uzen)
 37 villages in Murayama District
Echigo Province
21 villages in Kariwa District
33 villages in Santō District

List of daimyō

Further reading

Sasaki Suguru (2004). Boshin Sensō 戊辰戦争. Tokyo: Chuokōron-shinsha.

External links
 Kaminoyama Domain on "Edo 300 HTML"

Notes

Domains of Japan
1622 establishments in Japan
States and territories established in 1622
1871 disestablishments in Japan
States and territories disestablished in 1871
Dewa Province
History of Yamagata Prefecture
Ōuetsu Reppan Dōmei
Fujii-Matsudaira clan
Gamō clan
Matsudaira clan